The 2014 FIBA Asia Under-18 Championship for Women was the qualifying tournament for FIBA Asia at the 2015 FIBA Under-19 World Championship for Women. The tournament was held in Amman, Jordan from October 10 to October 17. 

China defeated Japan in the finals, 60-53 to notch their fourteenth title, while Korea edged Chinese Taipei in the battle for Third Place, 57-54. China, Japan and Korea will represent FIBA Asia at the 2015 FIBA Under-19 World Championship for Women which will be held in Russia.

The championship was divided into two levels: Level I and Level II. The two lowest finishers of Level I met the top two finishers of Level II to determine which teams qualified for the top Level of the 2016 Championships. The losers were relegated to Level II.

Qualification

Participating teams

Matches

Level I

|}

Level II

Qualifying round
Winners are promoted to Level I of the 2016 FIBA Asia Under-18 Championship for Women.

Final round
Top three teams qualify to the 2015 FIBA Under-19 World Championship for Women.

Semifinals

3rd place

Final

Final standing

Awards

References

2014
FIBA Asia Under-18 Championship for Women
2014–15 in Asian basketball
2014–15 in Jordanian basketball
International basketball competitions hosted by Jordan
2014 in youth sport